Weidner Memorial Senior Secondary School is a school in Lalbagh, Rajnandgaon, Chhattisgarh, India. It was established in 1975 in memory of Monseigneur John Weidner SAC, Bishop of Raipur.  Weidner Memorial Senior Secondary School is an unaided English Medium co-educational school administrated by a Catholic Christian Minority Society, Shiksha Prachar Avum Prasar Samithi, which belongs to the Archdiocese of Raipur.

References

External links

Catholic secondary schools in India
Primary schools in India
High schools and secondary schools in Chhattisgarh
Educational institutions established in 1975
1975 establishments in Madhya Pradesh

Schools in Rajnandgaon